Horace Everett Sherrell (January 23, 1886 – 1940) was an American college football player and coach.

Vanderbilt University
He was a prominent guard for Dan McGugin's Vanderbilt Commodores football team of Vanderbilt University. He also played baseball.

1907
Against Kentucky State in 1907; "On one of Craig's long runs Sherrell, who was only a sub last year, kept pace with the fast half back all the way, knocking down three tacklers en route to the goal." Sherrell was selected All-Southern.

Coaching career
He coached the football of the Pulaski Training School in Pulaski, Tennessee in 1908.

References

1886 births
1940 deaths
People from Lincoln County, Tennessee
Vanderbilt Commodores football players
All-Southern college football players
American football guards
Players of American football from Tennessee
Vanderbilt Commodores baseball players